The Very Best of Supertramp 2 is a best of album by the English rock band Supertramp originally released by A&M Records in November 1992.

Overview 
This compilation features 13 tracks from their five "prime" albums Crime of the Century, Crisis? What Crisis?, Even in the Quietest Moments...,  Breakfast in America and ...Famous Last Words... as well as the title track from their 1987 album Free as a Bird. The cover depicts the starry backdrop and grate from the cover of Crime of the Century, the hand carrying the glass from the cover of Breakfast in America, and the orange umbrella from Crisis? What Crisis?.

Reception

In his retrospective review, AllMusic's Jon O'Brien noted that this second collection contains less-familiar songs, including only five which had been released as singles, none of which were significant hits in the U.K. or U.S.

Track listing

Personnel

Supertramp
Rick Davies – vocals, keyboards, piano, harmonica
Roger Hodgson – vocals, guitar, keyboards, piano except on "Downstream" and "Free as a Bird"
Dougie Thomson – bass
John Anthony Helliwell – saxophones, clarinets, vocals
Bob C. Benberg – drums, percussion

Other performers
Claire Diament – backing vocals on "Don't Leave Me Now"
Mark Hart – guitar and keyboards on "Free as a Bird"
Marty Walsh – guitar on "Free as a Bird"
Linda Foot – backing vocals on "Free as a Bird"
Lise Miller – backing vocals on "Free as a Bird"
Evan Rogers – backing vocals on "Free as a Bird"
Karyn White – backing vocals on "Free as a Bird"

Certifications

References

1992 greatest hits albums
Albums produced by Ken Scott
Supertramp compilation albums
A&M Records compilation albums
Albums recorded at A&M Studios
Albums recorded at Trident Studios